The Chippewa Valley Symphony is an American orchestra based in Eau Claire, Wisconsin. The orchestra is conducted by Nobuyoshi Yasuda, who has been the music director since 1993.

The Chippewa Valley Symphony performs four season concerts each season, featuring guest artists, a young artist competition winner, and thematic classical music. The Symphony also presents a pops concert in the fall and a free concert in February.

References

External links
 The Chippewa Valley Symphony's main website
 Information on the symphony
 Information on Ticket Sales

Musical groups established in 1975
Performing arts in Wisconsin
American orchestras
Musical groups from Wisconsin
Eau Claire, Wisconsin